Theodore "Ted" Gold (December 13, 1947 – March 6, 1970) was a member of Weather Underground who died in the 1970 Greenwich Village townhouse explosion.

Early years and education
Gold, a red diaper baby, was the son of Hyman Gold, a prominent Jewish physician and of a mathematics instructor at Columbia University who had both been part of the Old Left. His mother was a statistician who taught at Columbia. His parents lived in an upper-middle-class high-rise apartment on Manhattan's Upper West Side.

While Gold's father had gone to medical school, Gold's parents had experienced economic hardship. But Gold considered his parents affluent and upper-middle-class. In 1958, before he reached the age of 11, Gold had attended his first civil-rights demonstration in Washington, D.C.  As a boy, he had gone to summer camp with other red-diaper babies at Camp Kinderland (Yiddish for "Children's Land") in upstate New York.  From 1959 to 1961 Gold attended Joan of Arc Junior High School (JHS 118) on 93rd Street between Amsterdam Avenue and Columbus Avenue.

Gold attended Stuyvesant High School, an elite public high school in Manhattan, where he was a member of the school's cross-country track team, the Stamp Club, and the History and Folklore Society.

Arriving at Columbia University in Fall 1964, Gold immediately became involved in campus Civil Rights Movement activity. He organized fund-raising activities for the Student Nonviolent Coordinating Committee (SNCC) Selma Project with Friends of SNCC at Columbia University, founded by Neal H. Hurwitz, College Class of '66.  Gold identified more with SNCC activists than with the activists of any other Civil Rights Movement groups.

During his freshman year at Columbia College Gold lived at home with his parents. At the beginning of his sophomore year, however, he moved into an 8th-floor single dormitory room in Columbia University's Furnald Hall. Initially Gold had planned to major in mathematics at Columbia, but by his junior year in Fall 1966, Gold had decided that sociology was a more relevant field for him.

By late 1966 Gold had rejected many Old Left cultural and lifestyle values which he had come to regard as too "bourgeois", but he considered himself a Marxist and a communist who sought to establish "decentralized socialism" in the United States.  If some other campus leftist would argue against a political position of his by stating that "Lenin wrote", or "Marx said", or "Mao says", however, Gold would generally reply by reminding the other leftist that "Marxism is a method and a tool, not a dogma".

In November 1966, Gold became active in helping to build a mass-based chapter of the Students for a Democratic Society (SDS) at Columbia.

Student activism at Columbia University
By March 1967, Gold was the vice-chairman of Columbia SDS and, between late March 1967 and March 1968, Columbia SDS Vice-Chairman Gold did most of the basic, menial work that was required to keep Columbia SDS functioning as a multi-issue radical student organizing group on campus.  He became the most politically influential leader of Columbia SDS's New Left "Praxis Axis" faction, which emphasized education, rather than confrontational direct action, as its primary campus organizing strategy.  They distributed materials, held rap sessions in the dorms, protested recruiters, and held referendums.

Antiwar rally

On April 20, 1967, as Columbia SDS vice-chairman, Gold led 300 anti-war student protesters from a sundial rally into Columbia University's John Jay Hall to demand that the Columbia Administration ban the U.S. Marines from recruiting inside the John Jay Hall lobby.  After a group of pro-war right-wing Columbia student athletes attacked the non-violent anti-war protesters inside the lobby, Gold quickly urged Columbia SDS people to retreat from John Jay Hall and return to the sundial rallying point in order to avoid further violence.

When the rally following the right-wing student attack on Columbia SDS people had ended, the Columbia SDS steering committee and Columbia Professor of Sociology Vernon Dibble, who was Columbia SDS's strongest faculty supporter, retreated to the back of the West End Bar on Broadway and 114th Street to plan what to do next.
       
"You let them push you out of John Jay Hall today.  You have to go back there again tomorrow to keep your credibility as a radical student group," Professor Dibble insisted.
       
Gold and other Columbia SDS leaders all then got into a debate.  Everyone agreed that Columbia SDS activists had to go back to confront the Marine recruiters the next day.  The major point of debate was whether Columbia SDS would gain more politically and win more mass support by stopping campus Marine recruitment and possibly fighting it out with other students, the right-wing protectors of the U.S. Marines, or by having a more mass-based, non-violent anti-war demonstration directed at protesting the policies of its main political enemy, the Columbia Administration.
       
"The Administration likes nothing better than to have students fighting other students.  Then it can portray itself as "above politics" and as "a neutral". We shouldn't fall into the Administration's trap and alienate all our new mass student support by leading students into a violent confrontation, which is what the Administration now wants us to do," Gold argued.
       
Gold's views were broadly supported by the rest of the Columbia SDS leadership. Its April 21, 1967 demonstration of the next day was going to be non-violent, disciplined, and focused more on protesting against the Columbia Administration's policies than on the jocks. Martin Luther King Jr.'s Southern Christian Leadership Conference (SCLC) aide, James Bevel, would be invited to address the campus rally.

Gold then played a major role in collectively writing the following letter from Columbia SDS to Columbia University faculty members, which indicates how Columbia SDS's leadership thought politically at that time.  A photocopy of this letter was found in the de-classified NYC Police Department's Red Squad organizational file on SDS, in 1987:

Following the April 1967 confrontation with the Marine recruiters, most of the newly politicized and radicalized Columbia SDS supporters returned to their normal academic and hedonistic routines.  But Gold and a few other Columbia SDS steering committee "heavies" spent the next few weeks putting together a Columbia SDS publication called New Left Notes: The Journal of Columbia SDS.  This SDS newspaper contained articles and columns on the SDS-Marine confrontation, on the 'free speech/freedom to recruit' vs. responsibility to resist Columbia complicity with the war machine controversy, on draft resistance, on the latest Vietnam War escalation and on Columbia's connection to the Pentagon's Institute for Defense Analyses (IDA).  It also included a short poem by Bertolt Brecht. A photocopy of this particular newspaper was found in the de-classified FBI file of Columbia SDS activist Bob Feldman in the late 1970s.
       
Much of the work of putting out this May 1967 Columbia SDS chapter newspaper was done at the West 115th Street apartment of Teddy Kaptchuk, who was the Columbia SDS chairman between late March 1967 and late March 1968.  Nancy Biberman, a Barnard College student who was active in Columbia SDS, did most of the technical preparation and layout of the 4-page newspaper, following article contributions from members of the Columbia SDS steering committee and editing by Ted "Acapulco" Gold.  Because Gold, like many associated with the New Left, was smoking cannabis on a regular basis by this time, people thought it was funny to start calling him by that nickname.

At the end of the Spring 1967 term, Gold decided he wanted to move out of his eighth floor Furnald Hall dormitory room and into an off-campus apartment during his senior year.  Columbia SDS founder David Gilbert also needed new living space in September 1967.  It was agreed that Gold and Gilbert and another Columbia SDS activist, Bob Feldman, would rent an off-campus apartment together during the 1967-1968 academic year.

After visiting Berkeley, California, and the West Coast in early June 1967, Gold returned to his Furnald Hall room by July 1967 and, for the second year in a row, worked as a summer group counselor of inner city high school students in Columbia University's "Double Discovery" tutoring program.  Gold also organized with other Columbia SDS activists on the Upper West Side a "Vietnam Summer" anti-war off-campus summer organizing project.

Patterned after the Freedom Summer campaign of 1964, "Vietnam Summer" was a nationwide student anti-war campaign to raise off-campus consciousness about current events in Vietnam.  SDS activists around Columbia set up tables on the sidewalks and canvassed Upper West Side apartment buildings.
       
In late July 1967, Gold and other Columbia SDS steering committee people started to meet in the high-rise apartment on LaSalle Street of the two Columbia SDS activists who were already married, Peter and Linda Schneider, a few blocks from Columbia's campus.  Meetings were held in the evening during the week, on a weekly or bi-weekly basis.  Political strategy for the coming 67-68 school year was discussed.  At one of the meetings, two Princeton University SDS activists also participated in the strategic discussion, talking about common experiences in attempting to mobilize students in opposition to both Princeton and Columbia's Institute for Defense Analyses connections and both Princeton and Columbia's performance of Pentagon-sponsored basic research and weapons development activity on campus.
         
Nearly all the people attending the informal summer Columbia SDS steering with Gold were "Praxis Axis" people.  Columbia SDS activist Bob Feldman brought to one of the meetings new research about IDA's involvement in "Project Agile" which directly related to weapons research for Vietnam War operational activity.  There was also much theoretical discussion at these informal summer meetings about New Left political strategy and Columbia SDS chapter internal organization and education.  Peter Schneider, Columbia SDS Chairman Teddy Kaptchuk and Gold, especially, seemed to feel that too great a gap existed between the political consciousness level of Columbia SDS's leadership and its rank-and-file's political consciousness level.  Each felt that in the 67-68 academic year a special effort should be made to involve rank-and-file members in smaller groups to maximize their participation in Columbia SDS chapter activity.
       
In the summer of 1967, Monthly Review published an English translation of Régis Debray's Revolution In The Revolution?, which argued in support of Che Guevara's "foci theory of revolution".  Near the end of the summer, a New York SDS regional organizer named Halliwell appeared at one meeting to make the case for applying Debray's theory of "mobile tactics" to Columbia University conditions, with Columbia SDS acting as the non-violent equivalent of Che's "guerrilla foci group".  According to Halliwell's analogy, the mass of Columbia students, like the mass of Latin American peasants, could only be aroused if Columbia SDS developed the capacity to act on an off-campus level as a mobile non-violent guerrilla foci at anti-war demonstrations.  In Halliwell's view, Columbia SDS should continue to use its usual educational methods to persuade future members of the new working-class (the mass of Columbia University student "peasants") to become off-campus mobile demonstrators who pushed the U.S. anti-war movement "from protest to resistance" by their mobile tactics.  In July 1967, however, Gold seemed only lukewarm about having Columbia SDS adopt some variant of Halliwell's "Debrayist" New Working-class organizing strategy.

In late July 1967, Gold was still thinking of going to graduate school in London, following his scheduled June 1968 graduation from Columbia College, in order to please his mother.  He thought that he would be able to get a good recommendation from Columbia Professor of Sociology Silver, who was still Gold's favorite professor at Columbia, on a personal level, at this time.  In July 1967, Gold had also become romantically involved with a recent Barnard College graduate named Trude Bennett, who was also working during the summer as a "Double Discovery" project counselor.
       
By the beginning of August 1967, Gold felt that the African-American ghetto rebellions of that summer meant that the mass of African-American people had outgrown Martin Luther King Jr.'s pacifist political line and the original nonviolent stance of Student Nonviolent Coordinating Committee, and were moving more in the direction that Malcolm X, Stokely Carmichael and the SNCC had predicted people would move. On WKCR, the Columbia student radio station, Gold also was invited to do a 15-minute political commentary show each week during the summer of 1967, in which he explained why he felt the black urban rebellions were justified.

Apartment
In September 1967, Gold moved most of his books and record albums from his parents' apartment to the West 94th Street apartment he now rented with Gilbert and Feldman.  But by early October 1967, Gold was mainly living with Bennett in her West 108th Street apartment, and by December 1967, he had completely moved out of the West 94th Street apartment and into Bennett's apartment.  At the October 21, 1967, anti-war march on the Pentagon, Gold and Bennett both joined the sit-in at the Pentagon and were arrested, although Gold had previously felt that National SDS's 1967 strategy of emphasizing local organizing, rather than organizing for semi-annual national anti-war marches, made the most strategic sense.  In explaining why he decided to participate in the October 21, 1967, non-violent mass sit-in at the Pentagon, Gold observed a few days later: "Sometimes spontaneous events happen that you have to take part in, even if it doesn't fit directly into a local organizing strategy. Being radical means being in the front line when masses of people are in motion."

The following month, Gold and Columbia SDS activist Mark Rudd were arrested in midtown Manhattan on November 14, 1967, for chanting through a bullhorn and encouraging anti-war demonstrators to go "block the limousines" in the streets and "block the rush-hour" traffic near the Hilton Hotel to protest the presence of U.S. Secretary of State Dean Rusk at a Foreign Policy Association gathering that was being held at the hotel.  Gold and Rudd were taken to the 100 Centre Street jail and charged with "incitement to riot" but, due to the efforts of the National Lawyers Guild, they were soon released and the charges were later dropped.

In his 2010 book, Mohamed's Ghosts, journalist Stephan Salisbury observed: "The FBI began gathering information on" Gold "in earnest in 1967." Gold's FBI files, according to Salisbury, "stacked on a table, stand at least a foot high;" and they are "full of descriptions of meetings, speeches, names of friends, telephone numbers, organizations--all meticulously detailed by Bureau agents, informers, and memos derived from electronic surveillance." 
                    
After Mark Rudd was elected as Columbia SDS Chairman in late March 1968, Gold was placed on disciplinary probation by the Columbia Administration, along with five other anti-war students (including Rudd), for demonstrating inside Low Library to protest Columbia University's institutional sponsorship of the Pentagon's Institute for Defense Analyses weapons research think-tank.  To protest the Columbia Administration's repression of "The IDA Six", on April 23, 1968, Gold joined Rudd in being one of the Columbia SDS activists who helped lead the 1968 Columbia Student Revolt, in which five Columbia University buildings were seized by over 700 anti-war Columbia and Barnard students.

Following his suspension for his political activity during his senior year at Columbia in May 1968, Gold enrolled in a summer teachers training course.  During the 1968-69 year, he worked as both a teacher in a private school and as a New York Regional SDS organizer of anti-war radical teachers for the newly formed Teachers for A Democratic Society (TDS) group.

Death
In 1969, Gold joined the Weatherman faction of Columbia SDS.  Gold had become more militant after a visit to Cuba, during which he and some other U.S. anti-war activists met with representatives of the Vietnamese people who were also opposed to continued U.S. military intervention in Indochina.

Five months after the Weatherman faction's October 1969 "Days of Rage" protests in Chicago, Gold died on March 6, 1970, in the Greenwich Village townhouse explosion at 18 West 11th Street in Greenwich Village, New York City. Diana Oughton and Terry Robbins also died in this explosion, in which Robbins and Oughton were building a nail bomb intended for a Fort Dix military dance event. Kathy Boudin and Cathy Wilkerson both survived the explosion. Gold was crushed to death by the building's façade, which killed him as he returned back to the townhouse. John Jacobs, the other member of the collective, was not present and went underground after the blast.

This occurred, according to Susan Braudy's book Family Circle, after Gold "had just returned to the first floor parlor after his first brief trip to the Strand Book Store".  Braudy's book also revealed that "in front of the burning house, an FBI agent who had been part of the surveillance team keeping watch on the young radicals quickly snapped pictures of the house's crumbling brick Greek-revival façade" and "since the buildings on the block were of significant design interest, [the FBI agent] had been posing as an architectural historian".

After the 1970 bombing, many members of the Weathermen were on the FBI's "most wanted" list. At the end of 1969 the Weathermen had changed their name to "Weather Underground Organization" as its members went underground, living beyond the reach of the law.

References
Notes

Sources

 Biographical folk song video.

1947 births
1970 deaths
Members of the Weather Underground
Members of Students for a Democratic Society
Stuyvesant High School alumni
COINTELPRO targets
Columbia College (New York) alumni
20th-century American Jews
Deaths by improvised explosive device in the United States
New Left
People from Morningside Heights, Manhattan